Jingili is a northern suburb of the city of Darwin, Northern Territory, Australia.

History
Jingili was constructed in the early 1970s. Jingili is named after the Jingili people, an Aboriginal tribe who inhabited the area around Elliott in the middle of the Territory.

The streets within Jingili are named after Flying Officers killed in the Darwin area during World War II and local people killed in action in France or Belgium during World War I.

Present day
Jingili is two kilometres from Casuarina Square. Jingili has a Primary School, a Pre-school and a Day-Care centre. The smaller shopping centre is well equipped for day-to-day shopping. One of Darwin's oldest cemeteries is located in this suburb not far from the Rapid Creek.

References

External links

http://www.placenames.nt.gov.au/origins/greater-darwin 

Suburbs of Darwin, Northern Territory